The Bayer designation Theta Crucis (θ Cru / θ Crucis) is shared by two star systems, in the constellation Crux:
θ1 Crucis
θ2 Crucis

Crucis, Theta
Crux (constellation)